The International Mathematics Competition (IMC) for University Students is an annual mathematics competition open to all undergraduate students of mathematics. Participating students are expected to be at most twenty three years of age at the time of the IMC. The IMC is primarily a competition for individuals, although most participating universities select and send one or more teams of students. The working language is English.

The IMC is a residential competition and all student participants are required to stay in the accommodation provided by the organisers. It aims to provide a friendly, comfortable and secure environment for university mathematics students to enjoy mathematics with their peers from all around the world, to broaden their world perspective and to be inspired to set mathematical goals for themselves that might not have been previously imaginable or thought possible. Notably, in 2018 Caucher Birkar (born Fereydoun Derakhshani), an Iranian Kurdish mathematician, who participated in the 7th IMC held at University College London in 2000, received mathematics' most prestigious award, the Fields Medal. He is now a professor at Tsinghua University and at the University of Cambridge. In 2022 a Kyiv-born mathematician, Maryna Viazovska, was also awarded the Fields Medal. She participated in the IMC as a student four times, in 2002, 2003, 2004 and 2005. She is now a Professor and the Chair of Number Theory at the Institute of Mathematics of the École Polytechnique Fédérale de Lausanne in Switzerland.

Students from over 200 universities from over 50 countries have participated over the first twenty nine competitions. At the 29th IMC in 2022 participants were awarded Individual Result Prizes, Team Result Prizes, Fair Play Prizes and Most Efficient Team Leader Prizes.

University College London has been involved in the organisation of the IMC and Professor John E. Jayne has served as the President from the beginning in 1994. The IMC runs over five or six days during which the competitors sit two five-hour examinations, each with five questions (six until 2008) chosen by a panel and representatives from the participating universities.  Problems are from the fields of Algebra, Analysis (Real and Complex), Combinatorics and Geometry.

History
The IMC began in 1994 in Plovdiv, Bulgaria, with 49 participants, mostly from Bulgaria, and was hosted by Plovdiv University "Paisii Hilendarski". The 2nd, 3rd and 4th IMC were also hosted by Plovdiv University "Paisii Hilendarski" in Plovdiv. From 1996 to 1999 the IMC was one of the activities of the Structural Joint European Union TEMPUS Project #S_JEP-11087-96, entitled "Modular Education in Mathematics and Informatics", which was the flag ship European Union TEMPUS Project in Bulgaria at the time, aimed at bringing Bulgaria's university mathematics and computing degree programs into line with those in the European Union in preparation for Bulgaria's entry into the European Union. University College London was the Contractor for this European Union TEMPUS Project and Professor Jayne was the Coordinator of the Project.  In 1998 the 5th IMC was moved to Blagoevgrad, Bulgaria, and was hosted by both the South-West University "Neofit Rilski" in Blagoevgrad and the American University in Bulgaria. The 5th IMC had 80 participants from 9 countries.

The 6th IMC was hosted by Eötvös Loránd University and held on Lake Balaton in Keszthely, Hungary, the 7th IMC was hosted by University College London in London, the 8th IMC was hosted by Charles University in Prague, Czech Republic, the 9th IMC was hosted by the University of Warsaw in Warsaw, Poland, the 10th IMC was hosted by Babeș-Bolyai University in Cluj-Napoca, Romania, the 11th IMC was hosted by Ss. Cyril and Methodius University of Skopje in Skopje, Macedonia, the 12th IMC was hosted by American University in Bulgaria in Blagoevgrad, the 13th IMC was hosted by Odessa University in Odessa, Ukraine, the 14th IMC and 15th IMC were again hosted by the American University in Bulgaria in Blagoevgrad, and the 16th IMC was hosted by the Eötvös Loránd University in Budapest. In 2009 the 16th IMC had 347 student participants and 65 teams. Since 2010 the IMC has been hosted by the American University in Bulgaria, in Blagoevgrad, with assistance from the South-West University "Neofit Rilski" in Blagoevgrad. The 26th IMC had 360 student participants and 77 teams. The 29th IMC had 663 student participants and 100 teams.

Summary

See also 
 List of mathematics competitions
 Intermediate Mathematical Challenge

References

External links 
IMC Official Website
Local site with problems, solutions, results
London Mathematical Society Newsletter March 2018, page 11
American Mathematical Society Opportunities "Contests and Competitions"
Profile at Student Competitions
American University in Bulgaria IMC News

Maths
Mathematics competitions
Recurring events established in 1994